Banham is a surname. Notable people with the surname include:

 Bob Banham (1912–1999), Australian rugby league footballer and coach
 Cliff Banham (fl. 1952), New Zealand footballer
 Frank Banham (born 1975), Canadian-Hungarian ice hockey player
 John Banham (1940–2022), British businessman
 Katharine Banham (1897–1995), English developmental psychologist
 Rachel Banham (born 1993), American basketball player
 Reyner Banham (1922–1988), English architectural critic
 Russ Banham (born 1954), American writer, reporter, and journalist
 Stanley Banham (1913–1984), English cricketer
 Stephen Banham (born 1968), Australian typographer
 Teresa Banham (born 1964), British television and theatre actress
 Tony Banham (born 1959), English historian